Communications in the unrecognized self-declared Republic of Artsakh refers to telephone, satellite and other communication services and regulations in the de facto Republic of Artsakh, that is internationally recognized as de jure part of Azerbaijan.

Karabakh Telecom, the only telecommunications company in Artsakh, was started on February 1, 2002 by the late Lebanese-Armenian businessman and Chairman Pierre Fattouch. In 2019, Fattouch was charged with tax evasion in Lebanon and in July 2019 a Lebanese Prosecutor General ordered a closure of quarries owned by Fattouch for failure to acquire a legal license. On December 10, 2020, the Organized Crime and Corruption Reporting Project (OCCRP) investigated the offshore firm Crossbridge Capital, which manages billions in shareholder assets, including those of Pierre Fattouch. 

KT is also run by the General Director Ralf Yerikian, a Lebanese-born businessman of Armenian origin. The company is considered a CJSC, a closed joint stock company, in which shares of company stock can be bought or sold by shareholders. The company had USD $9.9 million in revenue in the 4th quarter of 2019. From Q1 of 2020 until Q2 of 2021, it shared the same amount in revenue for every quarter - USD $11.1 million. The company has not publicly disclosed their accurate financials between 2020 and 2021. It has invested over USD $12 millions in mobile telecommunication projects throughout Artsakh.

See also 
 Telephone numbers in the Republic of Artsakh

References 

Republic of Artsakh
Artsakh